{{Infobox concert |
  | concert_tour_name = Parade Tour
  | image = 
  | image_caption = 
  | artist = Prince and The Revolution
  | type = 
  | album = Parade
                  Around the World in a Day
  | start_date = March 3, 1986
  | end_date = September 9, 1986
  | number_of_legs = 3
  | number_of_shows = 11 in North America  15 in Europe  4 in Asia  30 total (32 scheduled)
  | last_tour = Purple Rain Tour  (1984–1985)
  | this_tour = Parade Tour  (1986)
  | next_tour = Sign o' the Times Tour  (1987)
}}

The Parade Tour (also called the Under the Cherry Moon Tour) was a concert tour by American recording artist Prince in support of Prince and The Revolution's eighth studio album Parade and his 1986 film Under the Cherry Moon. The Hit n Run Tour was not a full scale American tour, but a string of concerts that was dubbed "Hit n Run" by Prince's manager. Most of those shows were announced days or hours before the actual concert took place. The Parade Tour marked the first full tour of Europe by Prince. It also saw the expanded Revolution line-up and featured Sheila E. and her band as an opening act for most shows.

History
The American leg of the tour is called the Hit n Run Tour. The Parade Tour marked the only tour of the expanded Revolution as most of the members of the defunct The Family band were absorbed into Prince's band, dubbed by Eric Leeds as "The Counter-Revolution". The band's expansion became a source of tension, as some of the original members were unhappy with the new additions, especially of the non-instrument playing dancers, Wally Safford and Greg Brooks, with Brown Mark remarking "I was [put] behind the piano, next to Bobby Z [standing] behind three guys that used to be bodyguards. I started feeling a little underappreciated." Wendy was bothered that her twin sister Susannah was now in the band, saying "I shared a womb with this person, do I have to share a stage?" Furthermore, Brown Mark, Wendy and Lisa felt that Prince was turning the band into more of an R&B/funk and soul band, moving away from the pop/rock and classical music that Prince had moved toward with his last three albums.

Right before the Parade Tour was scheduled to start overseas, Brown Mark, Wendy, and Lisa threatened to quit. In fact Bobby Z. literally caught Wendy and Lisa at the airport and begged them to stay for the tour. Eventually, all three were convinced to ride it out. But as the tour ended, it became clear that this would be the end of the group, and these were their final performances together. On the final night in Yokohama, Japan, Prince uncharacteristically smashed up all of his guitars after a final encore of "Purple Rain".

During the British tour, Prince was joined on stage by Ronnie Wood on guitar and Sting on bass. They performed a cover version of The Rolling Stones track "Miss You"; after the performance Prince said "I wish I wrote that". Following the tour, a bootleg was released via the official British fan club called Salvador Dalí EP which featured a recording of the performance of "Miss You".

Shortly after the Parade Tour in October 1986, The Revolution was disbanded, with Prince firing Wendy and Lisa, replacing Bobby Z. with Sheila E., and Brown Mark quitting.

The band
 Prince: Lead vocals, guitar, tambourine, and Hammond organ
 Wendy Melvoin: Guitar
 Miko Weaver: Guitar
 Brown Mark: Bass
 Lisa Coleman: Keyboards 
 Matt Fink: Keyboards
 Bobby Z: Drums
 Eric Leeds: Saxophone and flute
 Atlanta Bliss: Trumpet
 Susannah Melvoin: Backing vocals
 Jerome Benton, Wally Safford and Greg Brooks (known as The Bodyguards): Dancers and vocals

Typical set list

Also "Mutiny", "It's Gonna Be a Beautiful Night", "Do U Lie?", "Condition of the Heart", "The Ladder", "♥ or $", and "America" would be played on some shows.

The Paris performance of "It's Gonna Be a Beautiful Night" was recorded and overdubbed before being released on the Sign ☮' the Times'' album.

Tour dates

Notes
 The Detroit show on June 6, at Masonic Temple Auditorium was professionally recorded but never released, with the performance of "Anotherloverholenyohead" used as a promo video for the song, played on MTV.
 It is assumed that the Chernobyl disaster may have impacted the European leg of the tour. The Radiation released when the Chernobyl Nuclear Power Plant exploded spread an enormous amount of Effects of the Chernobyl disaster throughout the entire European continent.

References

Prince (musician) concert tours
1986 concert tours